Paper Man is the debut album led by American jazz trumpeter Charles Tolliver featuring Gary Bartz, Herbie Hancock, Ron Carter and Joe Chambers recorded in 1968 and first released on the British Black Lion label as Charles Tolliver and His All Stars then later released on the Freedom label

Reception

The AllMusic review by Scott Yanow awarded the album 4½ stars stating "This explorative and stirring music is well worth investigating".

Track listing
All compositions by Charles Tolliver
 "Earl's World" – 4:23
 "Peace With Myself" – 9:37
 "Right Now" – 5:47
 "Household of Saud" – 6:06
 "Lil's Paradise" – 7:05
 "Paper Man" – 6:11

Personnel
Charles Tolliver – trumpet
Gary Bartz – alto saxophone (tracks 4–6)
Herbie Hancock – piano
Ron Carter – bass
Joe Chambers – drums

References

1975 albums
Charles Tolliver albums
Freedom Records albums
Black Lion Records albums